Huỳnh Tấn Tài (born 17 August 1994) is a Vietnamese football player who plays for V-League club Công An Hà Nội.

Honours

International

Vietnam U23
 Third place : Southeast Asian Games: 2015

References

1994 births
Living people
Vietnamese footballers
Association football midfielders
V.League 1 players
People from Long An Province
Vietnam international footballers
Southeast Asian Games bronze medalists for Vietnam
Southeast Asian Games medalists in football
Competitors at the 2015 Southeast Asian Games
Saigon FC players
Long An FC players